Incheh Darrehsi (also Romanized as Īncheh Darrehsī and Īncheh Darrahsī) is a village in Gejlarat-e Sharqi Rural District, Aras District, Poldasht County, West Azerbaijan Province, Iran. At the 2006 census, its population was 84, in 17 families.

References 

Populated places in Poldasht County